Watford railway station was a railway station in Watford, Hertfordshire in the UK. It was opened by the London and Birmingham Railway (L&BR) and it was the first railway station to open in Watford. It closed in 1858 when it was replaced by Watford Junction railway station. Today the small ticket office is still standing and it is a Grade II listed building.

History
Watford station was situated on the north side of St Albans Road, approximately  further down the line from London than the present-day Watford Junction station. It was designed by the architect George Aitchison. The station provided first and second-class waiting rooms, a departure yard, a carriage shed and engine house. The platforms were situated in a deep cutting which was accessed via a staircase.

By 1839, the station is recorded in the Bucks Herald as having a corrugated iron roof, an engine shed and stationary pumping house with a tall chimney, and a footbridge.

From 1846, the L&BR was absorbed into the London and North Western Railway (LNWR). The old Watford station closed when it was replaced by the larger Watford Junction station, which opened on 5 May 1858. The new station was located south of St Albans Road in order to accommodate the newly constructed branch line to St Albans and later, the Watford and Rickmansworth Railway and the Watford DC Line. The junction station was rebuilt in 1909, and was extensively redeveloped in the 1980s.

The building today

The Grade-II-listed Old Station House still stands at 147A St Albans Road, a rare surviving example of architecture from the beginning of the railway age. It is one of two surviving intermediate station buildings in Britain from the early railways, the other being the original  station building, built by the Birmingham and Derby Junction Railway in 1837. Until 2018, the building was occupied by a second-hand car dealership.  it stands in the middle of the Watford Cross property development and plans have been announced to convert the building into a craft beer tap room.

See also
Watford station – a list of stations past and present

References

Notes

External links

Disused railway stations in Watford
Former London and Birmingham Railway stations
Railway stations in Great Britain opened in 1837
Railway stations in Great Britain closed in 1858
1837 establishments in England
1858 disestablishments in England
Grade II listed buildings in Hertfordshire
History of Watford